Paul Calvin Visser is an American politician who was mayor of the City of Flint, Michigan, serving as the last mayor selected under Flint's 1929 charter.

Early life

He Grew up in the outskirts of Flint Michigan with nine brothers and two sisters. Attended Wentworth and Tanner elementary schools and Kearsley High School graduating in 1954. His home while growing up was on a small farm a portion of which has become the Kearsley High School athletic field. Paul was an apprentice and then journeyman electrician 1954/1966, served as an assistant to US congressman Donald Riegle 1966/1971. 
Paul joined The Massachusetts Mutual Life Ins. Co. as an agent in 1971. Earned Chartered Life Underwriter designation(CLU), Chartered Financial Consultant (CHFC) and Master of Science in financial services from the American College in Bryn Mawr, PA. He received numerous insurance industry awards including Flint Agent of the year 13 times and Million Dollar Round Table achievement for 25 years. Paul served as the president of the 5000 member Mass Mutual National Agents Association in late 1980s. 
Community activities included positions with United Way, Goodwill Industries, Salvation Army and as president of the Flint Rotary Club. Paul was the founding Chairman of the Flint Cultural Center Corporation and played an important role in its early success. In 1998 Paul was named the C.S. Mott Citizen of the Year by the Flint Area Chamber of Commerce in recognition of his leadership in bringing about the successful reorganization of the Flint Cultural Center. In 2022 Paul was inducted into the Kearsley High School Hall of Fame in recognition of his accomplishments in life after high school.
In 2017 Paul and his wife Margaret returned to his roots in the Flint area after 20 years in Charlevoix and Traverse City MI. They now reside in Grand Blanc and winter in Ocala, Florida.
Paul and his wife Margaret are born again Christians believing in the saving grace of Jesus Christ. They worship their Lord at Timber Ridge Community Church in Dunnellon, FL and at Tyrone Covenant Presbyterian Church in Fenton, MI.

Political
In 1966 Visser ran unsuccessfully for Michigan State house of representatives 82nd District. He served on the Flint Civil Service Commission in 1972 and 1973. In 1973 he was elected to the Flint City Commission and was selected by his fellow City Commissioners as Mayor. His term expired in 1975.

References

Michigan Republicans
Mayors of Flint, Michigan
Living people
Year of birth missing (living people)
20th-century American politicians